Jessica is the daughter of Shylock, a Jewish moneylender, in William Shakespeare's The Merchant of Venice. In the play, she elopes with Lorenzo, a penniless Christian, and a chest of her father's money, eventually ending up in Portia and Bassanio's household. In the play's dramatic structure, Jessica is a minor but pivotal role. Her actions motivate Shylock's vengeful insistence on his "pound of flesh" from Antonio; her relationships with Lorenzo and Shylock serves as a mirror and contrast to Portia's with Bassanio and with her father; her conversion to Christianity is the end of Shylock's line's adherence to the Jewish faith.

Literary critics have historically viewed the character negatively, highlighting her theft of her father's gold, her betrayal of his trust, and apparently selfish motivations and aimless behaviour. Since the end of the 20th century their views have been more moderate and nuanced, pointing to an alternative reading that allows her actions to be motivated by love and generosity, and being driven by Shylock's own tyrannical and immoral behaviour.

Role in the play

The central plot of The Merchant of Venice is relatively straightforward: Antonio borrows money from Shylock to help his friend, Bassanio, court Portia, but, through misfortune, is unable to repay and is subjected to an onerous default (a literal "pound of flesh" cut from his body). In addition, the play contains subplots regarding Bassanio's courtship of Portia; Launcelot Gobbo's humorous interactions with his father, and his change of allegiance from Shylock to Portia and Bassanio; and Jessica and Lorenzo's elopement, with Shylock's savings, his casket of ducats.

The role of Jessica is a relatively minor one. She speaks a grand total of 660 words over the play's five acts. In the dramatic structure of the play, the role is, however, pivotal: her elopement with Lorenzo, taking her father's casket of gold ducats, motivates Shylock's vengefulness towards Antonio; she serves as a mirror highlighting the differences between Shylock's Jewish household and Portia's Christian one; and serves as the means by which Shylock is forcibly converted to Christianity.

Her first appearance on stage is in act 2, scene 3, in a brief scene with Launcelot Gobbo. Gobbo is leaving Shylock's service to give his allegiance to Bassanio, and Jessica bemoans the loss of his company in a household that is "hell". She speeds him along, to avoid her father seeing their interaction, with a gold ducat as a parting gift and a letter to Lorenzo. After Gobbo leaves, she muses to herself on what flaws are in her character that makes her ashamed to be her father's daughter, and that although she is related to him by blood she is alienated by his manners. She concludes the soliloquy determined to marry Lorenzo and convert to Christianity.

In act 2, scene 4, Gobbo bears the letter, containing Jessica's plans to elope with Lorenzo and as much of her father's valuables as she can find, to Lorenzo. He is pleased by the letter and its contents, and bids Gobbo return to let her know that he has received the letter and will not fail her. In act 2, scene 5, however, Gobbo is intercepted by Shylock, who berates him for his change of allegiance. Gobbo seizes on Shylock's repeated mentions of Jessica's name as a pretense to call her. When she arrives, Shylock gives her the keys to his house and the responsibility of keeping it safe while he dines with Antonio and Bassanio. Upon learning there will be a masquerade, he enjoins her to shutter the windows and not "gaze on Christian fools with varnished faces". He then bids Gobbo precede him to let Antonio and Bassanio know he will attend their dinner. Having no other option, Gobbo whispers to Jessica to "look out at window for all this. / There will come a Christian by / Will be worth a Jewess' eye." before leaving. Shylock catches the interaction and asks Jessica what Gobbo said, but Jessica deceives him and claims he was simply saying goodbye. Shylock then complains of Gobbo's sloth and vociferous appetite, claiming he is well rid of him and glad he now serves Bassanio, whom he dislikes. He leaves for the dinner, and Jessica soliloquises:

In the following scene—act 2, scene 6—Lorenzo and his friends come to Shylock's house, and Jessica greets them from a window, dressed as a boy. She asks Lorenzo to confirm his identity before lowering a casket of her father's ducats. Lorenzo bids her descend, but Jessica demurs, ashamed of her disguise. Lorenzo persuades her, and she goes inside to bring more of Shylock's ducats. Lorenzo praises her to his friends: "For she is wise, if I can judge of her, / And fair she is, if that mine eyes be true, / And true she is, as she hath proved herself. / And therefore, like herself, wise, fair, and true,". She joins them on the street and all but Lorenzo's friend Gratiano leaves. Antonio then arrives to tell Gratiano that the winds are propitious for sailing and that Bassanio is leaving immediately for Belmont to woo Portia. Gratiano expresses his desire to leave the city immediately.

Jessica next appears at Belmont in act 3, scene 2, accompanying Lorenzo and Salerio, a messenger delivering a letter to Bassanio from Antonio. The letter informs him that all Antonio's business ventures have failed, such that he has defaulted on the bond to Shylock, and that Shylock intends to collect on the "pound of flesh". Jessica informs them that she has heard her father speaking with his fellows, saying he "would rather have Antonio's flesh / Than twenty times the value of the sum / That he did owe him." Portia dispatches Bassanio to Venice to assist his friend, pausing only long enough for them to be married. Then announces that she and Nerissa, her maid, will stay in a nearby convent while their husbands are away. In her absence she asks Lorenzo and Jessica to manage her estate.

In act 3, scene 5, Jessica and Gobbo banter in the gardens of Belmont; Gobbo claiming that she is tainted by the sins of her father, and she can only hope that she was an illegitimate child and not actually related to Shylock. Jessica protests that then she would be visited by the sins of her mother, and Gobbo concurs that she would be damned either way. Jessica argues that she has been saved by her husband who has converted her to Christianity, to which Gobbo replies that Lorenzo is contributing to the raised price of pork by the conversion of Jews (who may not eat pork) to Christians (who do). Lorenzo joins them and Jessica recounts their conversation, leading to further banter between Lorenzo and Gobbo, until Gobbo leaves to prepare for dinner. In response to questioning by Lorenzo, Jessica praises Portia as great and peerless.

Act 5, scene 1—the final scene of the play, and following on from the courtroom scene in act 4—opens with Jessica and Lorenzo strolling in the gardens of Belmont. They exchange romantic metaphors, invoking in turn characters from classical literature: Troilus and Criseyde, Pyramus and Thisbe, Aeneas and Dido, Jason and Medea, and finally themselves in the same mode, until they are interrupted by Stephano, a messenger. No sooner has Stephano informed them that Portia and Nerissa will soon arrive than Gobbo comes with the same news for Bassanio and Gratiano. They decide to await the arrivals in the gardens, and ask Stephano to fetch his instrument and play for them.

Portia and Nerissa enter, followed shortly by Bassanio, Antonio, and Gratiano. After they are all reunited, Nerissa hands Lorenzo a deed of gift from Shylock, won in the trial, giving Jessica all of his wealth upon his death.

Character sources
The generally accepted sources for The Merchant of Venice are Giovanni Fiorentino's Il Pecorone and Richard Robinson's English translation of the Gesta Romanorum (1577), but neither of these contain the Jessica–Lorenzo plot, nor give their Shylock-analogues a daughter. For these elements Shakespeare probably mined Masuccio Salernitano's Il Novellino (1476) and Christopher Marlowe's The Jew of Malta.

In the 14th story of Il Novellino we have most of the elements of the Jessica–Lorenzo plot: a daughter guarded by a rich but miserly father; the lovers eloping with her father's gold and jewels; the father's despair, in equal measures, for the loss of both daughter and treasure; and the lovers' eventual marriage and happiness.

For the Jessica–Shylock relationship, John Drakakis, the editor of the Arden Shakespeare's third series edition, highlights the verbal connection between The Merchant of Venice and The Jew of Malta with Barabas's words when Abigail rescues his gold and Shylock's at Jessica's theft of his Ducats.

Another version of the play's plot can be found in Anthony Munday's Zelauto: The Fountain of Fame Erected in an Orchard of Amorous Adventures (1580). In this version it is Munday's Jessica analogue, Brisana, who pleads the case first in the courtroom scene, followed by Cornelia, the Portia analogue.

But the Jessica–Lorenzo plot ultimately stems from medieval archetypal plots and characters. The Christian in love with a Jewess appears frequently in exemplum from the 13th to the 15th century. Beatrice D. Brown, in her 1929 article, "Mediaeval Prototypes of Lorenzo and Jessica", finds the most direct match in "… MS. Royal 7 D. 1, a collection of theological pieces probably compiled by a Dominican friar at or near Cambridge in the thirteenth century." It contains a spendthrift Christian lover, the fair Jewess, the rich old father, the lovers robbing the father, and the father's conflicted grief over his daughter's betrayal and the loss of his treasure. However, in this story the Christian lover flees alone with the treasure.

Writing two decades later, James L. Wilson finds a better parallel in The Sultan of Babylon, an English story rooted in The Matter of France and the chanson de geste The Song of Roland. Here Laban—the Sultan of Babylon, a Saracen ruler—captures the Christian knights Oliver and Roland and intends to execute them. His daughter, Floripas, proceeds to murder her governess for refusing to help feed the prisoners; bashes the jailer's head in with his keychain when he refuses to let her see the prisoners; manipulates her father into giving her responsibility for them; brings them to her tower, and treats them as royalty; does the same for the remaining ten of the Twelve Peers when they are captured too; helps the Peers murder Sir Lucafere, King of Baldas when he surprises them; urges the Peers to attack her father and his knights at supper to cover up the murder; when her father escapes and attacks the Peers in her tower, she assists in the defence; then she converts to Christianity and is betrothed to Guy of Burgundy; and finally, she and her brother, Fierabras decide that there is no point trying to convert their father to Christianity so he should be executed instead. All this is justified to the audience simply because Floripas converts to Christianity and Laban is a Saracene:

Wilson concludes that since The Merchant of Venice was a comedy, and since its audience would be used to the conventions of medieval tales, an Elizabethan audience would not be overly concerned with Jessica's filial piety. "Like Floripas and Ferumbras and dozens of other medieval heathens she turned Christian, and that was obviously, and conventionally, the best possible thing she could do."

Critical history
Literary critics have historically viewed the character negatively, highlighting her theft of her father's gold, her betrayal of his trust, and her apparently selfish motivations and aimless behaviour. In her 1980 survey, "In Defense of Jessica: The Runaway Daughter in The Merchant of Venice", Camille Slights calls out Arthur Quiller-Couch's opinion in the 1926 The Cambridge Dover Wilson Shakespeare as an extreme but representative example:

Slights sees this as a consequence of sympathetic readings of Shylock, where the play is seen primarily as exposing Christian hypocrisy, and his actions merely natural responses to ostracism and prejudice. In such a reading Jessica's actions amount to abandoning her father and betraying him to his enemies. By the last half of the 20th century this "sentimentally sympathetic reading" was starting to be rejected, but without a corresponding reassessment of Jessica. She was still viewed as inhabiting primarily negative values, in contrast with the positive values associated with Portia, Bassanio, and Antonio. Writing in 1977, Raymond B. Waddington thinks that:

Slights contradicts this view, pointing out that it conflicts with "a natural audience response" and argues that "we must question judgments that deny the most obvious emotional force of Shakespearean plots and characters." Shakespeare's plays usually extend and deepen existing dramatic conventions, and Jessica must be seen in a context of classical and Elizabethan conventions for such characters. Slights highlights comedies where children rebel against a miserly father, or romances where daughters defy a repressive father for love. These conventions would be familiar for both Shakespeare and an Elizabethan theatre audience, and, indeed, modern audiences tend to accept Jessica's actions as natural within the context of the plot. Her escape from Shylock's repressive household to Belmont a quest for freedom, and from misfortune to happiness.

This view is supported by John Russell-Brown, the editor of the 1955 Arden Shakespeare second series edition of the play: "... nowhere in the play does Shylock show any tenderness towards his daughter ... as a Jewess, loved by a Christian, Jessica stood in a fair way for the audience's sympathy ..." In Munday's Zelauto, Brisana (Jessica) opposes her father, Trinculo (Shylock), and eventually elopes with Rodolpho (Lorenzo); all presented sympathetically for the audience. Similarly, in Salernitano's 14th novella, the daughter makes off with her father's money, to the same effect. "In both these examples, the father is avaricious ... It ranks him with the miserly fathers in Elizabethan and classical comedies, who are only fit to be dupes of their children ..."

18th-century editors

The first critical notice of Jessica in the 18th century was made by William Warburton, who commented on the line in act 5, scene 1: "Fair ladies, you drop manna in the way / Of starvèd people." Warburton's comment was that "Shakespear is not more exact in any thing, than in adapting his images with propriety to his speakers; of which he has here given an instance in making the young Jewess call good fortune, Manna." Unfortunately, as Samuel Johnson explains rather drily—in a note to Warburton's note—in his 1765 edition: "The commentator should have remarked, that this speech is not, even in his own edition, the speech of the Jewess." The lines in question are usually assigned to Lorenzo.

The next was by Edmond Malone in his 1790 edition. The editor of the Second Folio (1632) had emended the line "If a Christian do not / play the knave and get thee, I am much deceived", substituting did for do. This changed the meaning, as an acerbic Malone points out:

Malone's position turned out to be somewhat controversial. In his revised edition in 1821, multiple notes appeared in response. The first, by George Steevens, offers an alternate reading of the passage: "I suspect that the waggish Launcelot designed this for a broken sentence—and get thee—implying, get thee with child. Mr. Malone, however, supposes him to mean only—carry thee away from thy father's house." As does another by John Monck Mason:

Boswell printed both along with Malone's original note. At further issue was Malone's tarring of all the previous editors with the same brush, for which Steevens was particularly sore. He provided a further note exempting Isaac Reed from Malone's criticism on the grounds that Reed had followed the First Folio, not the Second. Malone's response was simply that "In answer to Mr. Steevens, I have to state that I printed this play in 1784, and that Mr. Reed's edition did not appear till 1785. I may add that I communicated to that gentleman this very correction."

The back and forth continued in notes on Jessica's line in act 5, scene 1: "I am never merry when I hear sweet music." Steevens opined that:

For this point, Steevens cites the word's use in Measure for Measure and a similar usage of dulcia by Horace in his Art of Poetry. Malone responds that "Sweet is pleasing, delightful, and such is the meaning of dulcis in Horace."

Notes and references

Notes

References

All references to The Merchant of Venice, unless otherwise specified, are taken from the Folger Shakespeare Library's Folger Digital Texts edition. Under their referencing system, acts, scenes, and lines are marked in the text, so 2.6.34–40 would be act 2, scene 6, lines 34 through 40.

Sources

Further reading

External links
 All lines spoken by Jessica, Folger Shakespeare Library

The Merchant of Venice
Female Shakespearean characters
Fictional creditors and moneylenders
Literary characters introduced in 1590
Antisemitism in literature
Fictional Jewish women
Fictional Italian people in literature
Fictional Italian Jews